Unrequited Infatuations is a memoir written by Steven Van Zandt, edited by Ben Greenman, and published in 2021 by Hachette Books.

References

External links

Publishers Weekly review. 

2021 non-fiction books
Autobiographies
Steven Van Zandt
Hachette (publisher) books
Books about television
HBO people